Iring Fetscher (1922–2014) was a German political scientist and researcher on Hegel and Marxism.

Fetscher was born on 4 March 1922 at Marbach am Neckar, and was brought up in Dresden. After the Second World War he studied at Tübingen and Paris, receiving a doctorate in 1950. He belatedly published his thesis Hegels Lehre vom Menschen in 1970. He habilitated in 1959 with a dissertation on the political philosophy of Jean-Jacques Rousseau.

From 1963 to 1988 Fetscher was Professor of Political Science and Social Philosophy at the Goethe University Frankfurt. He is identified with the "second generation" of the Frankfurt School, along with Jürgen Habermas and Alfred Schmidt. Leszek Kołakowski, while taking Fetscher to be a distinguished historian of Marxism with a critical but positive attitude, does not see him as of the Frankfurt School more than notionally.

In 1993, Iring Fetscher was honored with induction into the French Order of Academic Palms (Ordre des Palmes Académiques). Fetscher died on 19 July 2014.

Major works
 Von Marx zur Sowjetideologie. Wiesbaden 1956. (22 editions until 1987.)
 Rousseaus politische Philosophie. Zur Geschichte des demokratischen Freiheitsbegriffs. Neuwied, Berlin 1960.
 Der Marxismus. Seine Geschichte in Dokumenten, 3 vols., München 1963–1965.
 Marx and Marxism. New York: Herder & Herder, 1971. (Translation of Karl Marx und der Marxismus, 1967.)
 Die Geiß und die sieben Wölflein Weinheim 1976.
 Neugier und Furcht. Versuch, mein Leben zu verstehen. Hamburg: Hoffmann und Campe, 1995, . (Autobiography)

See also
 Goethe Plaque of the City of Frankfurt

References

1922 births
2014 deaths
German political scientists
German sociologists
Academic staff of Goethe University Frankfurt
Chevaliers of the Ordre des Palmes Académiques
Officers Crosses of the Order of Merit of the Federal Republic of Germany
Recipients of the Order of Merit of Baden-Württemberg
German male writers
German expatriates in France
Converts to Roman Catholicism from Lutheranism